Richard Berry (born Richard Élie Benguigui, 31 July 1950) is a French actor, film director and screenwriter. He has appeared in more than 100 films since 1972. He starred in The Violin Player, which was entered into the 1994 Cannes Film Festival.

Personal life
He has a daughter, Coline, born 1976, from his relationship with actress Catherine Hiegel. He married singer and actress Jeane Manson in 1984. The couple divorced in 1986. With his former wife Jessica Forde, a photographer and actress, he has a daughter, actress Joséphine Berry, born in 1992.

Since 2009, he has been in a relationship with actress Pascale Louange, with whom he has a daughter, born in 2014.

In 2005, he made headlines for donating one of his kidneys to his sister Marie Berry, who was born with Alport syndrome, a genetic kidney disease.

His brother, Philippe Berry, is a sculptor and the former husband of actress Josiane Balasko.

Allegations of sexual abuse

On 2 February 2021, it was revealed that Berry's daughter Coline had recently filed a complaint with Paris prosecutors alleging incest and sexual abuse by Berry. In a story on his Instagram account, Berry claimed Coline made the allegation for the first time seven years prior, writing: "As I announced to my family (in 2014) that my wife and I were expecting a child, Coline, herself pregnant, reacted with extreme violence, then, in an email sent to my wife, she for the first time alluded to the fact that she [had] been 'abused.'"

Selected filmography

As actor

 Mon premier amour (1978)
  (1981)
  (1982)
 Une chambre en ville (1982)
 La Balance (1982)
  (1984)
 La Garce (1984)
  (1985)
  (1985)
 Honeymoon (1985)
 A Man and a Woman: 20 Years Later (1986)
 Migrations (1988)
  (1989)
 Mayrig (narrator)
 L'entraînement du champion avant la course (1991)
 "Pour Sacha" (1991)
 Shadows of the Past (1991)
 My Life Is Hell (1991)
 Day of Atonement (1992)
 588 rue paradis (1992)
 Le Petit prince a dit (1992)
 The Violin Player (1994)
 L'Appât (1995)
 Adultery: A User's Guide (1995)
 Pédale douce (1996)
 Les Agneaux (1996)
 Un grand cri d'amour (1998)
 Quasimodo d'El Paris (1999)
 Les gens qui s'aiment (1999)
 15 August (2001)
  (2002)
 If I Were a Rich Man (2002)
 Tais-toi ! (2003)
 La Boîte noire (2005 – directed)
 L'emmerdeur (2008)
 Cliente (2008)
 22 Bullets (2010 – directed)
 Nos femmes (2015)
 The Origin of Violence (2016)
 Tout, tout de suite (2016)
 Number One (2017)
 Eva (2018)
 To Each, Her Own (2018)

As filmmaker

References

External links

1950 births
Living people
French male film actors
French film directors
French male screenwriters
French screenwriters
Male actors from Paris
20th-century French male actors
21st-century French male actors
Troupe of the Comédie-Française
French National Academy of Dramatic Arts alumni
French-language film directors